Single-machine scheduling or single-resource scheduling is an optimization problem in computer science and operations research. We are given n jobs J1, J2, ..., Jn of varying processing times, which need to be scheduled on a single machine, in a way that optimizes a certain objective, such as the throughput.

Single-machine scheduling is a special case of identical-machines scheduling, which is itself a special case of optimal job scheduling. Many problems, which are NP-hard in general, can be solved in polynomial time in the single-machine case.

In the standard three-field notation for optimal job scheduling problems, the single-machine variant is denoted by 1 in the first field. For example, " 1||" is an single-machine scheduling problem with no constraints, where the goal is to minimize the sum of completion times.

The makespan-minimization problem  1||, which is a common objective with multiple machines, is trivial with a single machine, since the makespan is always identical. Therefore, other objectives have been studied.

Minimizing the sum of completion times 
The problem 1|| aims to minimize the sum of completion times. It can be solved optimally by the Shortest Processing Time First rule (SPT): the jobs are scheduled by ascending order of their processing time .

The problem 1|| aims to minimize the weighted sum of completion times. It can be solved optimally by the Weighted Shortest Processing Time First rule (WSPT): the jobs are scheduled by ascending order of the ratio  .

The problem 1|chains| is a generalization of the above problem for jobs with dependencies in the form of chains. It can also be solved optimally by a suitable generalization of WSPT.

Minimizing the cost of lateness 
The problem 1|| aims to minimize the maximum lateness. For each job j, there is a due date .

The problem 1|prec| generalizes the 1|| in two ways: first, it allows arbitrary precedence constraints on the jobs; second, it allows each job to have an arbitrary cost function hj, which is a function of its completion time (lateness is a special case of a cost function). The maximum cost can be minimized by a greedy algorithm known as Lawler's algorithm.

The problem 1|| generalizes 1|| by allowing each job to have a different release time by which it becomes available for processing. The presence of release times means that, in some cases, it may be optimal to leave the machine idle, in order to wait for an important job that is not released yet. Minimizing maximum lateness in this setting is NP-hard. But in practice, it can be solved using a branch-and-bound algorithm.

Maximizing the profit of earliness 
In settings with deadlines, it is possible that, if the job is completed by the deadline, there is a profit pj. Otherwise, there is no profit. The goal is to maximize the profit. Single-machine scheduling with deadlines is NP-hard; Sahni presents both exact exponential-time algorithms and a polynomial-time approximation algorithm.

Maximizing the throughput 
The problem 1|| aims to minimize the number of late jobs, regardless of the amount of lateness. It can be solved optimally by the Hodgson-Moore algorithm. It can also be interpreted as maximizing the number of jobs that complete on time; this number is called the throughput.

The problem 1|| aims to minimize the weight of late jobs. It is NP-hard, since the special case in which all jobs have the same deadline (denoted by 1|| ) is equivalent to the Knapsack problem.

The problem 1||  generalizes 1|| by allowing different jobs to have different release times. The problem is NP-hard. However, when all job lengths are equal, the problem can be solved in polynomial time. It has several variants:

 The weighted optimization variant, 1||,  can be solved in time .
 The unweighted optimization variant, maximizing the number of jobs that finish on time,denoted  1||, can be solved in time  using dynamic programming, when all release times and deadlines are integers.
 The decision variant - deciding whether it is possible that all given jobs complete on time - can be solved by several algorithms, the fastest of them runs in time .

Jobs can have execution intervals. For each job j, there is a processing time tj and a start-time sj, so it must be executed in the interval [sj, sj+tj]. Since some of the intervals overlap, not all jobs can be completed. The goal is to maximize the number of completed jobs, that is, the throughput. More generally, each job may have several possible intervals, and each interval may be associated with a different profit. The goal is to choose at most one interval for each job, such that the total profit is maximized. For more details, see the page on interval scheduling.

More generally, jobs can have time-windows, with both start-times and deadlines, which may be larger than the job length. Each job can be scheduled anywhere within its time-window. Bar-Noy, Bar-Yehuda, Freund, Naor and Schieber present a (1-ε)/2 approximation.

See also 

 Interval scheduling

Many solution techniques have been applied to solving single machine scheduling problems. Some of them are listed below.
Genetic algorithms
Neural networks
Simulated annealing
Ant colony optimization
Tabu search

References

Optimal scheduling